DNA topoisomerase 3-alpha is an enzyme that in humans is encoded by the TOP3A gene.

Function 

This gene encodes a DNA topoisomerase, an enzyme that controls and alters the topologic states of DNA during transcription. This enzyme catalyzes the transient breaking and rejoining of a single strand of DNA which allows the strands to pass through one another, thus reducing the number of supercoils and altering the topology of DNA. This enzyme forms a complex with BLM which functions in the regulation of recombination in somatic cells.

Meiosis 

Recombination during meiosis is often initiated by a DNA double-strand break (DSB). During recombination, sections of DNA at the 5' ends of the break are cut away in a process called resection. In the strand invasion step that follows, an overhanging 3' end of the broken DNA molecule then "invades" the DNA of an homologous chromosome that is not broken forming a displacement loop (D-loop). After strand invasion, the further sequence of events may follow either of two main pathways leading to a crossover (CO) or a non-crossover (NCO) recombinant (see Genetic recombination and see Figure).  The pathway leading to a NCO is referred to as Synthesis-dependent strand annealing (SDSA).

In the plant Arabidopsis thaliana, multiple mechanisms limit meiotic COs.  During meiosis TOP3A and RECQ4A/B helicase antagonize formation of COs in parallel to FANCM helicase.  Sequela-Arnaud et al.  suggested that CO numbers are restricted because of the long-term costs of CO recombination, that is, the breaking up of favorable genetic combinations of alleles built up by past natural selection.

In the budding yeast Saccharomyces cerevisiae, the topoisomerase III (TOP3)-RMI1 heterodimer (that catalyzes DNA single-strand passage) forms a conserved complex with Sgs1 helicase (an ortholog of the human Bloom syndrome helicase). This complex promotes early formation of NCO recombinants during meiosis  The TOP3-RMI1 strand passage activity appears to have two important functions during meiosis.  First, strand passage activity is employed early in coordination with Sgs1 helicase to promote proper recombination pathway choice.  Second, strand passage activity is used later, independently of Sgs1 helicase, to prevent the persistence of unresolvable strand entanglements in recombination intermediates.

Interactions 

TOP3A has been shown to interact with Bloom syndrome protein.

References

Further reading